John Sexton I, of Canterbury, Kent, was a Member of Parliament for the constituency of Canterbury, Kent for four separate terms between 1393 and 1410, as well as serving as a Jurat and holding a commission of array.

References

Year of birth missing
Year of death missing
People from Canterbury
14th-century births
15th-century deaths
English MPs 1393
English MPs January 1397
English MPs January 1404
English MPs 1407